Francisco Goya (1746–1828) was a Spanish romantic painter and printmaker.

Goya may also refer to:

Film and television
 Goya or the Hard Way to Enlightenment, a 1971 East German film
 Goya (TV series), a 2015 Pakistani television series
 Goya Awards, a film award in Spain

Music
 Goya (band), a Polish pop group
 Goya: A Life in Song, a musical by Maury Yeston
 Goya (opera), an opera by Gian Carlo Menotti
 Goya guitar, a line of acoustic guitars created by Levin
 Goya, a line of electric guitars by Hagström
Goya MusicMan, a South African music collector and disc jockey.

Places 
 Goya, Argentina, a city in Corrientes Province, Argentina
 Goya Department, Corrientes Province, Argentina
 Goya (crater), a crater on Mercury

Ships
 , a Norwegian motor freighter used by Nazi Germany in World War II
 SS Goya, a Norwegian ship that carried eastern European refugees to New Zealand in 1951

Other uses 
 Goya Foods, a food manufacturer and distributor in the U.S. and Latin America
 Goya (moth), a genus of moth
 Goya (surname)
 Goya (wrestler) (b. 1987), Mexican professional wrestler
 Greek Orthodox Youth of America, a Greek-American youth group
 6592 Goya, a Main-belt asteroid
 Goya Museum, a museum in Castres, France
Goya (Madrid Metro), a station named after the Spanish painter
 Bitter melon or goya, a tropical and subtropical vine with edible fruit
 Goya, a biography by Lion Feuchtwanger
 Goya, a biography by Robert Hughes
 Goya, a nightclub in the former Neues Schauspielhaus, Berlin, Germany

See also 
 Goia (disambiguation)
 Goiás (disambiguation)